Southern Fried Rabbit is a 1953 Warner Bros. Looney Tunes cartoon directed by Friz Freleng. The cartoon was released on May 2, 1953, and stars Bugs Bunny and Yosemite Sam.

Plot
A severe drought has ruined the carrot crop in Bugs Bunny's northern home. Upon learning of a boom crop in Alabama, Bugs decides to happily make the trip to the fertile soils. After a lot of walking, he finds himself near the Mason–Dixon line that separates the drought-ravaged north from the fertile south; but as soon as he crosses the line, he is shot at by "Colonel" Sam, who chases Bugs back over the line.

Bugs asks Sam what the deal is, only to hear that Sam somehow believes that he is a soldier of the Confederate States of America and has received orders from General Lee to guard the borders between the Confederate States and the Union.  Bugs points out that the American Civil War ended almost 90 years ago (the cartoon itself was animated in 1953), but Sam refuses to accept this and says he will remain guarding the border until he hears the orders to do otherwise from Lee, which will obviously never come. Sam then shoots at Bugs and forces him to run away, prompting the rabbit to make several attempts to cross the border.

First, Bugs disguises himself as a banjo-playing slave, singing "My Old Kentucky Home". When Sam asks for something "more peppy", Bugs promptly sings "Yankee Doodle", leading Sam to call Bugs a traitor. Bugs then forces a whip into Sam's hands, begs Sam not to beat him, and runs off. Bugs immediately returns in disguise as Abraham Lincoln, scolds Sam for "whipping slaves", and hands him a card to "look [him] up at [his] Gettysburg Address". However, Bugs' cover is blown when Sam sees his cotton tail sticking out of Abe's trenchcoat.

Infuriated, Sam chases Bugs into a tree. Bugs blows out Sam's match when he tries to light a bomb, and when Sam tries it again away from the tree, Bugs blows it out with an extended pipe. Sam goes even further away in the third attempt; but with more ground to cover, the fuse runs out as Sam runs back, and the bomb detonates in his hands.

Bugs then disguises himself as Stonewall Jackson (referred to as "General Brickwall Jackson"), fooling Sam into marching into a well. Afterwards, Bugs flees from Sam into a mansion, where he disguises himself as Scarlett O'Hara (from Gone with the Wind); and when Sam attempts to search the mansion, he takes a cannon blast while looking inside a closet and is dissuaded from searching any further.

Finally, disguised as an injured Confederate soldier, Bugs succeeds in tricking Sam to leave Alabama by informing him that the Yankees are in Chattanooga. Sam heads to Chattanooga, and the finale has him threatening the New York Yankees, preventing them from competing in an exhibition baseball game against the Chattanooga Lookouts.

Publication notes
Due to later controversies about the portrayal of ethnic stereotypes in cartoons, the scene where Bugs crosses the border disguised as a slave and Abraham Lincoln was cut from the episode's television broadcastings.

Home media
Southern Fried Rabbit was made available on a VHS tape, and its restored, uncut version on DVD in Looney Tunes Golden Collection: Volume 4.

See also
 List of Bugs Bunny cartoons
 List of Yosemite Sam cartoons
 List of films featuring slavery

References

External links
New York Times review

1953 films
1953 animated films
1953 short films
American Civil War films
Looney Tunes shorts
Warner Bros. Cartoons animated short films
Films based on works by Harriet Beecher Stowe
Short films directed by Friz Freleng
Films set in the Southern United States
Cultural depictions of Abraham Lincoln
Bugs Bunny films
1950s Warner Bros. animated short films
Film controversies
African-American-related controversies in film
Race-related controversies in animation
Race-related controversies in film
Ethnic humour
Yosemite Sam films
1950s English-language films